Acura Pharmaceuticals Inc. is a pharmaceutical company focused on the development and commercialization of deterrents to medication abuse and misuse. , the company had several opioid products under development, which would use "Aversion Technology".  , it was a publicly traded company, listed on NASDAQ under the symbol "ACUR".

History
In 2013, the Company settled Oxecta patent litigation with Impax Laboratories (IPXL) and Par Pharmaceutical.

License agreements

The company has an agreement to license, develop and commercialize opioid analgesic products with King Pharmaceuticals.

Product adoptions

In 2013, multiple retailers – including Kroger and Fruth Pharmacy – stocked Acura's product Nexafed.

References

External links
Official website
Acura LinkedIn Page
Prescription Medicine

Pharmaceutical companies established in 1935
Companies listed on the Nasdaq
Pharmaceutical companies of the United States
Health care companies based in Illinois
1935 establishments in the United States
1935 establishments in Illinois
Companies established in 1935